Boston.com is a regional website that offers news and information about the Boston, Massachusetts, region. It is owned and operated by Boston Globe Media Partners, the publisher of The Boston Globe.

History

Boston.com was one of the first news websites on the public web, launched in late October 1995 by Boston Globe Electronic Publishing Inc. The domain name was purchased from the Boston-area café chain Au Bon Pain in exchange for print advertisements for charities chosen by Au Bon Pain's CEO.

Since its inception, Boston.com has covered a wide range of stories of interest to people in the region. It was the primary website of The Boston Globe until September 2011, when the Globe launched a subscription-only website. Boston.com remained free, to provide "full daily sports coverage, breaking news updates, online features, and lifestyle information".

The site also maintains a mobile application for iPhone and Android devices, which connects readers with stories featured on the website.

Relation to The Boston Globe
On September 12, 2011, The Boston Globe launched a separate site at BostonGlobe.com that put most content from its newsroom behind a paywall. Since that time, Boston.com has been a separate, standalone entity providing coverage of local news, sports, weather, and leisure on a free, advertising-supported platform. The two media outlets share office space at 1 Exchange Place in Downtown Boston.

References

External links

1995 establishments in Massachusetts
American news websites
Internet properties established in 1995
The Boston Globe